Kylie and Garibay (stylized as Kylie + Garibay) are a musical duo composed of Australian singer-songwriter Kylie Minogue and American record producer Fernando Garibay. The duo are based in Los Angeles, California, U.S., where Garibay's home studio is located. They released their debut extended play (EP), entitled Sleepwalker, on September 24, 2014. The EP was accompanied by a short film directed by English fashion designer William Baker, and was presented at Minogue's fourteenth concert tour, the Kiss Me Once Tour. Sleepwalker was followed by the duo's self-titled EP, which was released the next year on September 11, 2015. Kylie and Garibay featured collaborations with Jamaican musician Shaggy, Australian singer Sam Sparro, and Italian record producer Giorgio Moroder.

Discography

Extended plays

Charted songs

References

2014 establishments in California
Electronic music duos
Electronic music groups from California
Kylie Minogue
Musical groups established in 2014
Musical groups from Los Angeles
Parlophone artists
Pop music duos
Warner Records artists
Electronic music supergroups
Pop music supergroups
Musical collectives